Orlin D. Velev (born November 3, 1963 in Plovdiv, Bulgaria) is the INVISTA Professor in the Department of Chemical and Biomolecular Engineering at North Carolina State University. He is best known for his work in soft matter, colloid science, and nanoscience.

Biography 
Orlin D. Velev was born in Plovdiv, Bulgaria. Velev received his B.S. and M.Sc. in Chemical Physics and Theoretical Chemistry in 1989 from Sofia University. He continued his doctoral studies at Sofia University to earn his Ph.D. in Physical Chemistry in 1996, while also spending one year as a researcher at the Nagayama Protein Array project in Japan. Following a postdoctoral position (1996-1998) and research assistant professorship (1998-2001) at the University of Delaware, Velev joined the faculty in the Department of Chemical and Biomolecular Engineering at North Carolina State University in 2001, where he currently resides. He is married to Anka Veleva and they have one son, Orlin Velev Jr., who works in the aerospace industry.

Professional contributions

Research interests 
Velev's research covers a broad range of topics, but his key contributions are in the area of colloidal assembly. His research has advanced the field of directed and programmed colloidal assembly by using electric fields to make structures out of nanoparticles, microspheres, Janus and patchy particles. He has also discovered and developed new types of self-propelling microdevices, gel-based photovoltaic cells, soft robotic hydrogel actuators and microbot prototypes. His earlier research achievements include the first report of convective assembly of 2D colloidal crystals, the first templated fabrication of “colloidosome” and supraparticle clusters and the synthesis of "inverse opal” structures.

Awards and honors
Velev has contributed more than 200 scientific articles and technologies based on his research have formed the basis of two companies, Xanofi and Benanova. Velev has served as member of the Editorial Advisory Boards of Langmuir, Chemistry of Materials, Biomicrofluidics, Particle, and Advances in Colloid and Interface Science, and is a fellow of the ACS and MRS.
Langmuir Lecturer Award (ACS Division of Colloid and Surface Chemistry, 2018)
R. J. Reynolds Tobacco Company Award (R.J. Reynolds)
Andreas Acrivos Award (AIChE, 2017)
Fellow of the Materials Research Society (MRS, 2017)
Fellow of the American Chemical Society (ACS, 2011)

References

External links
Velev Research Group Homepage
Orlin D. Velev Personal Website

1963 births
Living people
American chemical engineers
Bulgarian engineers
Bulgarian chemists
Sofia University alumni
North Carolina State University faculty
Scientists from Plovdiv
Bulgarian emigrants to the United States
Fellows of the American Chemical Society